Bueng Phra railway station is a railway station located in Bueng Phra Subdistrict, Phitsanulok City, Phitsanulok. It is located 381.875 km from Bangkok railway station and is a class 1 railway station. It is on the Northern Line of the State Railway of Thailand. The station opened on 24 January 1908 as part of the Northern Line extension from Pak Nam Pho to Phitsanulok. PTT Public Company Limited operates a crude oil depot adjacent to the site and the railway operates several oil freight services from this station (to Mae Nam Station).

Train services
 Local 401/402 Lop Buri-Phitsanulok-Lop Buri
 Local 407/408 Nakhon Sawan-Chiang Mai-Nakhon Sawan

References
 Ichirō, Kakizaki (2010). Ōkoku no tetsuro: tai tetsudō no rekishi. Kyōto: Kyōtodaigakugakujutsushuppankai. 
 Otohiro, Watanabe (2013). Tai kokutetsu yonsenkiro no tabi: shasō fūkei kanzen kiroku. Tōkyō: Bungeisha. 

Railway stations in Thailand